Frederick Augustus Ross (December 25, 1796 – April 13, 1883) was a Presbyterian New School clergyman in both Kingsport, Tennessee, and Huntsville, Alabama, slave owner, publisher and pro-slavery author of the book Slavery As Ordained of God (1857).

Frederick Augustus Ross was born in Cumberland County, Virginia, as the son of David Ross, a wealthy businessman in Richmond, Virginia, who himself had emigrated from Scotland in the mid-eighteenth century.

Ross was educated at Dickinson College located in Carlisle, Pennsylvania, with the class of 1815, although he did not graduate with his class.

Enters ministry in Northeast Tennessee
 
During 1818, Ross entered into the Presbyterian ministry, emancipated his slaves, and then he moved to Kingsport, Tennessee, where he had his massive Rotherwood mansion, constructed on the Netherland Inn Road. Ross had his daughter, Rowena, educated at boarding schools located within the northern United States.

Ross became pastor of Old Kingsport Presbyterian Church in Kingsport during 1826, and during 1828 he briefly labored as an evangelist in both Kentucky and Ohio. During the eruption of the Old School–New School Controversy division of the Presbyterian general assembly in 1837 and 1838, Ross aligned himself with the New School branch and he would remain as pastor of the Old Kingsport Presbyterian Church until 1852. Beginning in 1855, Ross became pastor of the First Presbyterian Church in Huntsville, Alabama, holding this charge until 1875 and continuing as pastor emeritus until his death in 1883.

Author, controversy

Together with both James Gallaher and David Nelson, Ross edited a monthly publication entitled The Calvinistic Magazine, that was first founded in 1826 and continued in operation through 1832.

In the late 1840s, Ross began quarreling with Methodist minister and Whig newspaper publisher William Gannaway Brownlow. Ross had earlier "declared war" on Methodism as a co-editor in his Calvinist Magazine, published from 1827 to 1832. Although distracted by internecine Old School–New School Controversy conflict within the Presbyterian church for nearly a decade, Ross resurrected the Calvinist Magazine in 1845. Ross argued that the Methodist Church was despotic, comparing it to a "great iron wheel" that would crush American liberty, and he went on to state that most Methodists were descended from Revolutionary War loyalists, and accused the religion's founder, John Wesley, of believing in ghosts and witches.

Brownlow initially responded to Ross with a running column, "F.A. Ross' Corner," in the Jonesborough Whig. In 1847, he launched a separate paper, the Jonesborough Quarterly Review, which was dedicated to refuting Ross's attacks, and embarked on a speaking tour that summer. Brownlow argued that while it was common in Wesley's time for people to believe in ghosts, he provided evidence that many Presbyterian ministers still believed in such things. He derided Ross as a "habitual adulterer" and the son of a slave, and accused his relatives of stealing and committing indecent acts (Ross's son responded to the latter charge with a death threat). This quarrel between the two mem continued until Brownlow moved his newspaper to Knoxville in 1849.

Ross would go on to author a book in 1857 (written in response to the earlier 1852 book,  Uncle Tom's Cabin: or Life among the Lowly, by Harriet Beecher Stowe) that he entitled Slavery As Ordained of God. Abraham Lincoln later read Slavery As Ordained of God and found in Ross's interpretation of the divine will pertaining to the national question of slavery as material for a telling passage as to how slavery advocates and owners themselves benefit from slavery within the 1858 Lincoln–Douglas debates.

post civil war

He died in Huntsville, Alabama.

Notes

References

External links
 
 

1796 births
1883 deaths
Presbyterian Church in the United States of America ministers
Dickinson College alumni
People from Cumberland County, Virginia
19th-century American clergy